Rajdhanir Buke is a Bengali-language East Pakistani drama film, directed by Ehtesham. The film stars Rahman, Shabnam, Chitra Sinha, Subhash Dutt, Nargis, Golam Mustafa, and Azim. In the film Shabnam, Subhash Dutt and Golam Mustafa were debuted.

The film was released on 4 September 1960 in East Pakistan.

Cast
 Abdur Rahman - Hashem
 Shabnam
 Chitra Sinha
 Subhash Dutta - Karamat Ali
 Nargis
 Golam Mustafa - Landlord
 Azim

Music
Rajdhanir Buke film music was directed by Robin Ghosh and Ferdousi Rahman. Song lyric by KG Mostafa. Talat Mahmud sing the most of the song. In the film song "Tomare Legechhe Eto Je Bhalo" gain most popularity.

Track list

References

External links
 

1960 films
1960 drama films
Bangladeshi drama films
Bengali-language Pakistani films
1960s Bengali-language films
Films directed by Ehtesham